Michael Maduell is president of the Sovereign Wealth Fund Institute (SWFI).

Biography

Early life
Michael Maduell was born in San Leandro, CA. His father, Robert (Bob) Maduell, was a procurement engineer at Hewlett Packard and his mother, Phuong (Linda) My Lam, is a Vietnamese war refugee who supported the U.S. as a language translator. Maduell went to high school at Rocky Mountain High School in Fort Collins, CO.  Maduell is a graduate of California State University, Sacramento and has a Masters of Science in Finance from Saint Mary's College of California. He is the grandson of Charles Edward Maduell, who founded Anamet Laboratories, Inc in Berkeley, California. He is a descendant of Carlos Maduell of Tortosa, Spain who immigrated to New Orleans in the 1800s working for the Avendano Brothers.

Michael interned at a low-income redevelopment agency located in Sacramento during college.

Career
He has worked at the California Public Employees' Retirement System (CalPERS) and Reuters. He founded the Sovereign Wealth Fund Institute, also known as SWFI. Maduell is a leading researcher, commentator, and advisor in the sovereign wealth fund, pension, and long-term institutional investor space.

Economic and financial commentary
Michael Maduell commented on Temasek Holdings advancement of acquiring energy companies.  He stated in CFO Insight, "This is a long-term investment in a major energy company that is currently discounted due to the YPF nationalisation [Repsol’s subsidiary in Argentina, eds.]."

During the Libyan revolution, CNN Money interviewed Michael Maduell on Gaddafi's influence on sub-Saharan Africa and Libya's sovereign wealth fund.  Maduell argued Gaddafi remained in power for so long because "Gadhafi is providing support where there is none."

In 2013, policymakers and thinktanks were discussing ways to improve the U.S. economy, leading to the idea of creating a federal sovereign wealth fund.  Maduell told CNBC in an article that creating a Norwegian-like wealth fund would trigger "a heated debate between the federal government vs. state governments over resources," Maduell added. "The politics would be paralyzing, which is why it hasn't been done yet."

In 2016, Michael Maduell was quoted in the LA Times saying, "Sovereign wealth funds are going to play a much bigger role now in tech", said Michael Maduell, president of the Sovereign Wealth Fund Institute. "They have the capital and are looking for the best returns".

He was a frequent contributor to CNBC.

Maduell is sought out on his expertise on sovereign wealth funds, including institutional investors in the Middle East and their influence on foreign policy.

References

External links
Sovereign Wealth Fund Institute
Michael Maduell Official Bio Website

Sacramento State
Saint Mary's College of California alumni
American business and financial journalists